Seyyed Shahab (also Romanized as Seyyed Shahāb; also known as Saīd Shahāb) is a village in Seyyed Shahab Rural District, in the Central District of Tuyserkan County, Hamadan Province, Iran. At the 2006 census, its population was 2,933, in 649 families.

References 

Populated places in Tuyserkan County